The Embassy of the Republic of Serbia in Moscow is the diplomatic mission of Serbia in the Russian Federation. It is located at 46 Mosfilmovskaya Street in the Ramenki District of Moscow Current Ambassador of Serbia to Russia is Momčilo Babić.

In 2011, the embassy was attacked by National Bolshevik Party activists.

See also 
 Russia–Serbia relations
 Diplomatic missions in Russia
 Diplomatic missions of Serbia

References 

Russia–Serbia relations
Serbia
Moscow